Henrietta Lacks Health and Bioscience High School, commonly known as HeLa (alternatively spelled He-La), is a high school located in Vancouver, Washington.  It is the most recent high school built in the Evergreen Public Schools, and one of six high schools in the district. The school's colors are light blue, dark blue, and grey. The school's mascot is the Phoenix. The school's principal is Amy Haynes. The school has 35 staff members.

History
Opening in 2013, HeLa was the sixth high school built in the Evergreen School District. Construction began in 2011. Major funding for the construction of the school came from PeaceHealth Southwest Medical Center as well as numerous other hospitals, clinics, and research facilities in Vancouver, Washington and Portland, Oregon. The school was named after Henrietta Lacks, an African-American woman who was the unwitting donor of medical research cells (derived from a cancerous tumor) which were cultured to create the first known human immortal cell line.

Academic programs
HeLa High offers students a full high school curriculum with a focus on medical careers. Students choose from five program areas, and can participate in job shadows and internships during their junior and senior year.

The five programs of study are:

Nursing and Patient Services 
Biomedical Engineering
Pharmacology
Biotechnology
Public health

The curriculum includes all of the basic core classes, math, science, English, and history, as well as their specific science electives. HeLa also offers electives including music, digital arts, world languages, and leadership.  HeLa High students are supported by an advocacy program called Helix,  The Helix program focuses on student achievement, college, and career goals and advisory capstone research projects.

See also
Evergreen Public Schools
PeaceHealth Southwest Medical Center
Henrietta Lacks
Union High School

References

 https://web.archive.org/web/20141009170044/http://www.evergreenps.org/SchoolInfo/hlh/Pages/default.aspx
 http://www.oregonlive.com/clark-county/index.ssf/2012/10/new_vancouver_high_school_will.html
 http://dailyinsider.info/open-house-for-henrietta-lacks-health-and-bioscience-high-school-nov-15/

Vancouver, Washington
High schools in Washington (state)
High schools in Clark County, Washington
High schools in Vancouver, Washington